Two ships of the Royal Navy have been named HMS Lydiard

 , was a  destroyer that served in World War I.
 Lydiard (FY177), launched in 1935, was a 440-ton trawler purchased by the Admiralty in September 1939 and converted for anti-submarine warfare. She served in World War II and was sold in 1946.

Royal Navy ship names

de:HMS Lydiard